The Drifter E.P. is the second EP of 2008 from Lindi Ortega and was released on iTunes on 23 September 2008 and on CD on 17 March 2009.

Unlike her previous releases, this EP is almost exclusively Lindi and her guitar. The title track, Drifter, was recorded on an answering machine. Lindi wanted to play a new song for her A&R rep so she called him and played it on his answering machine. He was so impressed he decided to include it on the EP, taking it straight from his answering machine.

Track list
All tracks written by Lindi Ortega unless otherwise noted.

Personnel
Lindi Ortega - vocals, guitar, piano

References

2008 EPs
Lindi Ortega albums